Sammy Gustafsson (born October 17, 1988) is a Swedish ice hockey goaltender. He is currently playing with Visby/Roma HK of the Hockeyettan.

Gustaffson made his Swedish Hockey League debut playing with Örebro during the 2008-09 Elitserien season.

References

External links

1988 births
Living people
Örebro HK players
Visby/Roma HK players
Karlskrona HK players
Swedish ice hockey goaltenders